The Silver Pagoda is located on the south side of the Royal Palace in Chey Chumneas, Phnom Penh. The official name is Wat Ubaosoth Ratanaram, also known as Wat Preah Keo Morakot (Khmer: វត្តព្រះកែវមរកត, "Temple of the Emerald-Crystal Buddha") which is commonly shortened to Wat Preah Keo (Khmer: វត្តព្រះកែវ) in Khmer.

The vihara houses many national treasures including many golds and jeweled Buddha statues. The most significant are a small green crystal Buddha (the "Emerald Buddha" of Cambodia — some sources maintain it was made of Baccarat Crystal in the 17th century  but that's not possible since Baccarat Crystal didn't exist until the 18th century, and other sources indicate it was made in the 19th century by Lalique, a glass designer who lived in the 19th-20th century), and a life-sized gold Maitreya Buddha commissioned by King Sisowath, weighing 90 kg and dressed in royal regalia and set with 9584 diamonds, the largest of which weighing 25 carats, created in the palace workshops during 1906 and 1907. After the Cambodian Civil War the gold Maitreya Buddha lost most of its two-thousand diamonds. During King Norodom Sihanouk's pre-Khmer Rouge reign, the Silver Pagoda was inlaid with more than 5,329 silver tiles and some of its outer facades was remodeled with Italian marble. However, only a small area of these tiles are available to be viewed by the public on entering the pagoda.

The wall that surrounds the structures is covered with murals of the Reamker painted in  1903-1904 by Cambodian artists directed by the architect of the Silver Pagoda Oknha Tep Nimit Mak. The legend of Preah Ko Preah Keo is also represented by two statues.

It is a notable wat (Buddhist temple) in Phnom Penh; Its grounds being used for various national and royal ceremonies. The cremated remains of Norodom Sihanouk are interred in the stupa of Kantha Bopha located on the temple's compound.

History 
Preah Keo Morakot temple does not have monks, so King Norodom Sihanouk went to live there during the construction of Preah Phnos for a year (on the 14th day of the second month of the year).  Kor Nopvasak, BE 2490 (July 31, 1947), he was ordained as a monk and took the Temple of Preah Keo Morakot Twi as a place of dharma to take up the practice of Dharma.  Every day.  Due to the fact that Preah Keo Morakot Temple has a monarch as a monk, this temple was renamed Wat Ubaosoth Preah Chin Rangsey Reachea Norodom Ratanaram (ភាសាខ្មែរ: វត្តឧបោសថ ព្រះជិនរង្សីរាជានរោត្ដម រតនារ៉ាម), which means Wat Preah Dharma  Of the Dharma Pagoda God of the Light King Norodom Wealth Aries This temple is called Preah Vihear Preah Keo Morakot because of its statue.  Made of precious stones made from emeralds kept in this temple. This temple is called Wat Prak by foreign tourists because the floor is made of silver, the whole floor is covered with 5329 pieces of silver in  One tablet weighs 1,125 kg.  There are 1,650 artifacts on display in the temple, most of which are made of gold, silver, bronze and adorned with precious stones such as diamonds, rubies, sapphires and other precious stones.  The statue is made of 90 kilograms of gold and contains 9584 diamonds, the largest of which is 25 carats.   This quarterly monarch had a history with the Lan Xang dynasty of Laos, now has the same shape as the Lao Phra Bang, a gift from the Cambodian king to the Lao king.  Fa Ngum when the Thai king invaded Angkor (1352 - 1357) during the reign of King Suriyavong.   Preah Arya Metrey was established in a workshop at the palace during 1906 and 1907 by King Sisowath of Cambodia.  The walls surrounding the buildings are covered with Reamker paintings painted in 1903-1904 by a Cambodian artist led by the architect of Wat Prak Oknha Tep Nimit Mak.  The legend of Preah Ko Preah Keo is also represented by  These two sculptures also edit the content and year of the story.

Mural on the walls of the Wat 
On the walls of the gallery are ancient paintings that tell the story of Reamker from beginning to end.  This painting was painted in 1903-1904 under the direction of Oknha Tep Nimit, painted by 40 Cambodian artists.  This painting starts from the eastern gallery on the south side and surrounds the entire gallery, which is 642 meters long and 3 meters high.  This means that people look at this gallery in a circle.  The ancient paintings around the Reamker gallery show the peculiarities that are not captured or completely copied from the Indian Ramayana because in Reamker the story seems to be somewhat inaccurate.  The secret is to look far ahead to know the story behind it.  Or until you know some Ramayana stories to understand.  The content of this Reamker story is interpreted in some scenes as a big-skinned puppet show or as various sculptures and used as a divination of fortune-tellers.  Today, these paintings are in a state of disrepair and are slowly disappearing due to weather and rock-eating germs, as well as human-caused vandalism.  In 1985, the Cambodian government collaborated with the Polish government on a project to protect and restore the paintings, but the restoration of the paintings took only five years to complete, with funding coming from the budget.  The project has expired. With a royal decree from His Majesty King Norodom Sihanouk, in 2015, the project was revived with the cooperation of a group of foreign and Cambodian craftsmen.  Many more.  Next, it is strongly hoped that the next generation of Cambodian children will see this wonderful painting again.

Gallery

References

Literature 
 

Buddhist pilgrimage sites in Cambodia
Buddhist temples in Cambodia
Museums in Phnom Penh
19th-century Buddhist temples